Raymond High School is a public high school in the state of New Hampshire. Located in the town of Raymond, over 400 students attend. Its mascot is the ram, and the school colors are green and white.

References

External links

Public high schools in New Hampshire
Schools in Rockingham County, New Hampshire
Raymond, New Hampshire